Marcelo Saldaño (16 May 1985 – 25 January 2014) was an Argentine road racing cyclist and track cyclist for amateur team Forjar Salud UOM.

Born in San Juan, he was the Argentine 2011 national road race champion.

Palmares 

 Vuelta a San Juan - 1 stage (2006)
 Vuelta a la Bebida - 1 stage (2009)
 Vuelta a Lavalle - 1 stage (2009)
 Vuelta a San Juan - 1 stage (2010)
 Giro del Sol - 1 stage & Overall (2010)
 Vuelta de Albardón (2010)
 Doble Chepes - 1 stage (2011)
  National Road Race Champion (2011)

References

External links
Profile at Cycling Fever

1985 births
2014 deaths
People from San Juan, Argentina
Argentine track cyclists
Argentine male cyclists
Sportspeople from San Juan Province, Argentina